Theresa Thibodeau (born June 9, 1975) is an American politician who served as a member of the Nebraska Legislature 2017 to 2018. In November 2021, Thibodeau entered the Republican primary for Governor of Nebraska.

Early life and career 

Thibodeau was born Theresa Sanderson on June 9, 1975, in Kansas City, Missouri. She attended Capistrano Valley High School and graduated in 1993. She attended the University of Nebraska at Omaha from 1996 to 1998, and graduated with a bachelor's degree in psychology.

Political career

Nebraska State Legislature 

Thibodeau was appointed to represent District 6, in Omaha, by Governor Pete Ricketts in October 2017. The seat became vacant following the resignation of the incumbent Republican, Joni Craighead. Thibodeau was encouraged by Pete Rickets to submit her name for the position, which she did on October 13, two weeks after the deadline to submit on September 29. Thibodeau was defeated by Democrat Machaela Cavanaugh in the 2018 midterm elections held in November 2018.

Thibodeau unsuccessfully sought the Republican nomination for governor in the 2022 Nebraska gubernatorial election. She came in fourth place with 6.05% of the vote, behind  Jim Pillen (33.75%), Charles Herbster (30.13%), and Brett Lindstrom (25.68%).

Electoral history

Personal life 
Thibodeau is Catholic. She and her husband, Joseph Thibodeau, live in Nebraska with their three children, two daughters and a son.

References 

Women state legislators in Nebraska
21st-century American women politicians
21st-century American politicians
Democratic Party Nebraska state senators
1975 births
Living people
Politicians from Kansas City, Missouri
University of Nebraska Omaha alumni
Catholics from Missouri
Catholics from Nebraska